The bibliography of Niall Ferguson, a Scottish historian based in the United States who is the Milbank Family Senior Fellow at the Hoover Institution at Stanford University and a Senior Faculty Fellow at the Belfer Center for Science and International Affairs at Harvard University. Previously, he was a professor at Harvard, the London School of Economics and New York University, a visiting professor at the UK New College of the Humanities, and a senior research fellow at Jesus College, Oxford, England.

Ferguson writes and lectures on international history, economic and financial history and British and American imperialism. 

He has written more than a dozen books.

Books

 American edition.

 American ed. has the title: The war of the World: Twentieth-century Conflict and the Descent of the West  (also a Channel 4 series)

Articles
"Let Germany Keep Its Nerve", The Spectator, 22 April 1995, pages 21–23
"Europa nervosa", in Nader Mousavizadeh (ed.), The Black Book of Bosnia (New Republic/Basic Books, 1996), pp. 127–32
"The German inter-war economy: Political choice versus economic determinism" in Mary Fulbrook (ed.), German History since 1800 (Arnold, 1997), pp. 258–278
"The balance of payments question: Versailles and after" in Manfred F. Boemeke, Gerald D. Feldman and Elisabeth Glaser (eds.), The Treaty of Versailles: A Reassessment after 75 Years (Cambridge University Press, 1998), pp. 401–440
"'The Caucasian Royal Family': The Rothschilds in national contexts" in R. Liedtke (ed.), 'Two Nations': The Historical Experience of British and German Jews in Comparison (J.C.B. Mohr, 1999)
"Academics and the Press", in Stephen Glover (ed.), Secrets of the Press: Journalists on Journalism (Penguin, 1999), pp. 206–220
"Metternich and the Rothschilds: A reappraisal" in Andrea Hamel and Edward Timms (eds.), Progress and Emancipation in the Age of Metternich: Jews and Modernisation in Austria and Germany, 1815–1848 (Edwin Mellen Press, 1999), pp. 295–325
"The European economy, 1815–1914" in T.C.W. Blanning (ed.), The Short Oxford History of Europe: The Nineteenth Century (Oxford University Press, 2000), pp. 78–125
"How (not) to pay for the war: Traditional finance and total war" in Roger Chickering and Stig Förster (eds.), Great War, Total War: Combat and Mobilization on the Western Front (Cambridge University Press, 2000), pp. 409–34
"Introduction" in Frederic Manning, Middle Parts of Fortune (Penguin, 2000), pp. vii–xviii
"Clashing civilizations or mad mullahs: The United States between informal and formal empire" in Strobe Talbott (ed.), The Age of Terror (Basic Books, 2001), pp. 113–41
"Public debt as a post-war problem: The German experience after 1918 in comparative perspective" in Mark Roseman (ed.), Three Post-War Eras in Comparison: Western Europe 1918-1945-1989 (Palgrave-Macmillan, 2002), pp. 99–119
"Das Haus Sachsen-Coburg und die europäische Politik des 19. Jahrhunderts", in Rainer von Hessen (ed.), Victoria Kaiserin Friedrich (1840–1901): Mission und Schicksal einer englischen Prinzessin in Deutschland (Campus Verlag, 2002), pp. 27–39
"Max Warburg and German politics: The limits of financial power in Wilhelmine Germany", in Geoff Eley and James Retallack (eds.), Wilhelminism and Its Legacies: German Modernities, Imperialism and the Meaning of Reform, 1890–1930 (Berghahn Books, 2003), pp. 185–201
"Introduction", The Death of the Past by J. H. Plumb (Palgrave Macmillan, 2003), pp. xxi–xlii
"Globalization in historical perspective: The political dimension", in Michael D. Bordo, Alan M. Taylor and Jeffrey G. Williamson (eds.), Globalisation in Historical Perspective (National Bureau of Economic Research Conference Report) (University of Chicago Press, 2003)
"Introduction to Tzvetan Todorov" in Nicholas Owen (ed.), Human Rights, Human Wrongs: Oxford Amnesty Lectures (Amnesty International, 2003)
"The City of London and British imperialism: New light on an old question", in Youssef Cassis and Eric Bussière (eds.), London and Paris as International Financial Centres in the Twentieth Century (Oxford University Press, 2004), pp. 57–77
"A bolt from the blue? The City of London and the outbreak of the First World War", in Wm. Roger Louis (ed.), Yet More Adventures with Britainnia: Personalities, Politics and Culture in Britain (I.B. Tauris, 2005), pp. 133–145
"The first 'Eurobonds': The Rothschilds and the financing of the Holy Alliance, 1818–1822", in William N. Goetzmann and K. Geert Rouwenhorst (eds.), The Origins of Value: The Financial Innovations that Created Modern Capital Markets (Oxford University Press, 2005), pp. 311–323
"Prisoner taking and prisoner killing in the age of total war", in George Kassemiris (ed.), The Barbarization of Warfare (New York University Press, 2006), pp. 126–158
"The Second World War as an economic disaster", in Michael Oliver (ed.), Economic Disasters of the Twentieth Century (Edward Elgar, 2007), pp. 83–132
"The Problem of Conjecture: American Strategy after the Bush Doctrine", in Melvyn Leffler and Jeff Legro (eds.), To Lead the World: American Strategy After the Bush Doctrine (Oxford University Press, 2008)

References

Bibliographies of Scottish writers